The Iwahig River, also known as Balsahan River, is a watershed located in the Iwahig Penal Colony in Palawan, Philippines.

Topography
level. Soil types includes Guimbalaon clay, Taburos clay and Bay clay loam. The basin's large area are unclassified with its mountainous land with a closed canopy of trees that covers almost the entire basin.

Flooding
The towns of Iwahig ang Montible were found susceptible to flooding by the study conducted by the Mines and Geosciences Bureau.

References

Rivers of the Philippines
Landforms of Palawan